Berea College is a private liberal arts work college in Berea, Kentucky. Founded in 1855, Berea College was the first college in the Southern United States to be coeducational and racially integrated. Berea College charges no tuition; every admitted student is provided the equivalent of a four-year scholarship. There are still other fees, such as room and board, textbooks, and personal expenses. Most students receive grants or scholarships and do not have to take out many loans, if any at all.

Berea offers bachelor's degrees in 33 majors. It has a full-participation work-study program in which students are required to work at least 10 hours per week in 1,500 campus and service jobs in more than 130 departments. Students are paid a modest salary and typically use the funds to cover the cost of housing, meals and other expenses. Students do not get to choose their work assignment their first year but can choose during subsequent years.

Berea's primary service region is southern Appalachia but students come from more than 40 states in the United States and 70 other countries. Approximately one in three students identifying as a person of color. One alumnus, John Fenn, has won a Nobel Prize.

History
Founded in 1855 by the abolitionist and Augusta College graduate John Gregg Fee (1816–1901), Berea College admitted both black and white students in a fully integrated curriculum, making it the first non-segregated, coeducational college in the South and one of a handful of institutions of higher learning to admit both male and female students in the mid-19th century. The college began as a one-room schoolhouse that also served as a church on Sundays on land that was granted to Fee by politician and abolitionist Cassius Marcellus Clay. Fee named the new community after the biblical Berea. Although the school's first articles of incorporation were adopted in 1859, founder John Gregg Fee and the teachers were forced out of the area by pro-slavery supporters in that same year.

Fee spent the Civil War years raising funds for the school, trying to provide for his family in Cincinnati, Ohio, and working at Camp Nelson. He returned afterward to continue his work at Berea. He spent nearly 18 months working mostly at Camp Nelson, where he helped provide facilities for the freedmen and their families, as well as teaching and preaching. He helped get funds for barracks, a hospital, school and church.

In 1866, Berea's first full year after the war, it had 187 students, 96 Black and 91 white. It began with preparatory classes to ready students for advanced study at the college level. In 1869, the first college students were admitted, and the first bachelor's degrees were awarded in 1873. Almost all the private and state colleges in the South were racially segregated. Berea was the main exception until a new state law in 1904 forced its segregation. The college challenged the law in state court and further appealed to the U.S. Supreme Court in Berea College v. Kentucky. When the challenge failed, the college had to become a segregated school, but it set aside funds to help establish the Lincoln Institute in 1912 near Louisville to educate Black students. In 1950, when the Day Law was amended to allow integration of schools at the college level, Berea promptly resumed its integrated policies.

In 1925, famed advertiser Bruce Barton, a future congressman, sent a letter to 24 wealthy men in America to raise funds for the college. Every single letter was returned with a minimum of $1,000 in donation. During World War II, Berea was one of 131 colleges nationally that took part in the V-12 Navy College Training Program which offered students a path to a navy commission.

Up until the 1960s, Berea provided pre-college education in addition to college level curriculum. In 1968, the elementary and secondary schools (Foundation School) were discontinued in favor of focusing on undergraduate college education.

Presidents

(as of 2022)

Academics

Berea College offers 33 majors and 39 minors from which its 1,600 students can choose. Students who wish to pursue a field of study that cannot be met through an established Berea College major have the option to submit a proposal for an independent major, provided they meet the criteria in the college catalog's definition of a major. The student must secure independent major advisers (primary and secondary). Its most popular majors, based on 2021 graduates, were:
Business Administration and Management (30)
Computer and Information Sciences (28)
Biology/Biological Sciences (21)
Psychology (20)
Human Development and Family Studies (19)
Mass Communication/Media Studies (16)
Engineering Technologies/Technicians (14)
Political Science and Government (14)

To ensure every student has access to fully experience a liberal arts education, the college provides significant funding to assist students in studying abroad. Berea students are also eligible to win the Thomas J. Watson Fellowship, which provides funding for a year of study abroad following graduation. Like many private colleges, Berea does not enroll students based upon semester hours. Berea College uses a course credit system, which has the following equivalencies:
 A 0.25 credit course is the equivalent of 1 semester hour.
 A 0.50 credit course is the equivalent of 2 semester hours.
 A 0.75 credit course is equivalent to 3 semester hours.
 A 1.00 credit course is the equivalent to 4 semester hours.

All students are required to attend the college on a full-time basis, which is 3.00 course credits of enrollment, or 12 semester hours. Students must be enrolled in at least 4.00 course credits to be considered for the Dean's list. Enrollment in 4.75 or more course credits requires the approval of the Academic Adviser, and a minimum cumulative GPA of 3.30. There are also optional Summer opportunities to engage in study. Students may take between 1 and 2.25 credits during Summer. One Berea course credit is equivalent to four semester hours (6 quarter hours). Part-time enrollment is not permitted except during Summer term. A cumulative GPA of 2.0 is required in all majors in order to graduate with a bachelor's degree.

Rankings

In 2021, Washington Monthly ranked Berea College 13th in the U.S. among liberal arts colleges based on its contribution to the public good, as measured by social mobility, research, and promoting public service. The 2022 annual ranking of U.S. News & World Report categorizes Berea as 'more selective' and rates it 30th overall, 1st in "Service Learning," 2nd for "Most Innovative Schools," tied for 13th in "Best Undergraduate Teaching" and tied for 6th in "Top Performers in Social Mobility" among liberal arts colleges in the U.S.
 Kiplinger's Personal Finance places Berea 35th in its 2019 ranking of 149 best value liberal arts colleges in the United States.

Scholarships and work program
Berea College provides all students with full-tuition scholarships and many receive support for room and board as well. Berea College charges no tuition; every admitted student is provided the equivalent of a four-year, full-tuition scholarship (currently stated to be worth over $150,000; $39,400 per year for 2018–2019). Admission to the college is granted only to students who need financial assistance (as determined by the FAFSA); in general, applications are accepted only from those whose family income falls within the bottom 40% of U.S. households. About 75% of the college's incoming class is drawn from the Appalachian region of the South and some adjoining areas, and about 8% are international students. Generally, no more than one student is admitted from a given country in a single year (with the exception of countries in distress such as Liberia). This policy ensures that 70 or more nationalities are usually represented in the student body of Berea College. All international students are admitted on full scholarships with the same regard for financial need as U.S. students.

In order to support its extensive scholarship program, Berea College has one of the largest financial reserves of any American college when measured on a per-student basis. The endowment was $1.6 billion as of June 30, 2021. The base of Berea College's finances is dependent on substantial contributions from individuals, foundations, corporations that support the mission of the college and donations from alumni. A solid investment strategy increased the endowment from $150 million in 1985 to its current amount.

As a work college, Berea has a student work program in which all students work on campus 10 or more hours per week. Berea is one of nine federally recognized work colleges in the United States and one of two in Kentucky (Alice Lloyd College being the other) to have mandatory work study programs. Employment opportunities range from busing tables at the Boone Tavern Hotel, a historic business owned by the college, to leading campus tours for visitors and prospective students, or making brooms, ceramics and woven items in Student Craft. Other job duties include janitorial labor, building management, resident assistant, teaching assistant, food service, gardening and grounds keeping, information technology, woodworking, and secretarial work. Berea College has helped make the town a center for quality arts and crafts.

As of 2022, students are paid an hourly wage from $5.60 to $8.60 by the college, based on the WLS ("Work, Learning, and Service") level attached to individual labor positions. The more complicated reality is that students, with various hourly rates depending on level of responsibility—and in combination with government grants—are actually making more than $30 per hour, with the bulk of that money going toward their tuition in the form of scholarship. A portion of it is returned to the students in the form of a tax-free paycheck to cover their incidentals and other expenses. The college regularly increases student pay on a yearly basis, but it has never been equivalent to the federal minimum wage in the school's history. Because of the scheduling demands of both an academic requirement and a labor requirement, students are not allowed to work at off-campus jobs.

Christian identity
Berea was founded by Protestant Christians. It maintains a Christian identity separate from any particular denomination. The college's motto, "God has made of one blood all peoples of the earth," is taken from Acts 17:26. One General Studies course is focused on Christian faith, as every student is required to take an Understandings of Christianity course. In an effort to be sensitive to the diverse preferences and experiences of students and faculty, these courses are designed to be taught with respect for the unique spiritual journey of each individual, regardless of religious identification.

Library collections
The Hutchins Library maintains an extensive collection of books, archives, and music pertaining to the history and culture of the Southern Appalachian region. The Southern Appalachian Archives contain organizational records, personal papers, oral histories, and photographs. Included are the papers of the Council of the Southern Mountains (1912–1989) and the Appalachian Volunteers (1963–1970).

Student life

Since 2002, all students at Berea have received laptops that they take with them when they graduate. Students are not required to pay for the computers, though they do provide a small fee to support the technological infrastructure. Students must have a special permit to have a car on campus. Such permits are rarely granted to first- or second-year students.

Athletics
The Berea athletic teams are called the Mountaineers. The college is of the Division III level of the National Collegiate Athletic Association (NCAA), primarily competing in the Collegiate Conference of the South (CCS) starting in the 2022–23 academic year. They were also a member of the United States Collegiate Athletic Association (USCAA). The Mountaineers previously competed in the USA South Athletic Conference (USA South) from 2017–18 to 2021–22; as an NCAA D-III Independent from 2014–15 to 2016–17; and in the Kentucky Intercollegiate Athletic Conference (KIAC; now currently known as the River States Conference (RSC) since the 2016–17 school year) of the National Association of Intercollegiate Athletics (NAIA) from 1916–17 to 2013–14.

Berea competes in 14 intercollegiate varsity sports: Men's sports include baseball, basketball, cross country, golf, soccer, tennis and track & field; while women's sports include basketball, cross country, soccer, softball, tennis, track & field and volleyball.

Move to NCAA Division III
On February 20, 2012, the NCAA announced it had granted Berea permission to begin a one-year period exploring membership in its Division III, non-scholarship athletic program.

On May 4, 2016, the USA South announced that Berea would join the league effective in the 2017–18 school year.

Joining the CCS
The USA South announced in February 2022 that it would split into two leagues the following July, with eight of its then 19 members, including Berea, establishing the new Collegiate Conference of the South.

Men's basketball
On February 4, 1954, Irvine Shanks was in the lineup for Berea against Ohio Wilmington, breaking the color barrier in college basketball in Kentucky.

Notable alumni and faculty
 Daniel S. Bentley (1850–1916), American minister, writer, newspaper founder
 John "Bam" Carney – educator; member of the Kentucky House of Representatives from Campbellsville
 Dean W. Colvard – former president of Mississippi State University, notable for his role in a 1963 controversy surrounding the participation of the university's basketball team in the NCAA Tournament
 John Courter  – educator; an American composer, organist, and carillonneur, considered one of the leading contemporary composers for the carillon
 John Fenn – recipient of 2002 Nobel Prize in Chemistry. Despite his future success, Fenn always felt that he was limited by the lack of meaningful math education in his undergrad years.
 Finley Hamilton – United States Representative from Kentucky.
 Christopher Thomas Hayes – American film and television actor, writer, and puppeteer. Performs the characters of Hoots the Owl and Elijah, father of Wes, on Sesame Street
 bell hooks (Gloria Jean Watkins) – Distinguished Professor in Residence in Appalachian Studies, author of over thirty books
 Julia Britton Hooks – second African-American woman in the United States to graduate from college and paternal grandmother of Benjamin Hooks
 Silas House – NEH Chair in Appalachian Studies, author and activist
 George Samuel Hurst - A health physicist and professor of physics at the University of Kentucky
 Juanita M. Kreps – U.S. Secretary of Commerce under President Jimmy Carter
 C.E. Morgan – author of All the Living and The Sport of Kings
 Tharon Musser – Tony Award-winning lighting designer known especially for her work on A Chorus Line
 Willie Parker – abortion provider and reproductive rights activist
 K.C. Potter – academic administrator and LGBT rights activist
 Jeffrey Reddick – American screenwriter, best known for creating the Final Destination series
 Jack Roush – founder, CEO, and owner of Roush Fenway Racing, a NASCAR team
 Green Pinckney Russell (1861–1939), American school administrator, college president, and teacher
 Tijan Sallah - Gambian poet, short story writer, biographer and economist at the World Bank
 Helen Maynor Scheirbeck – Assistant Director for Public Programs at the Smithsonian Institution's National Museum of the American Indian
 Djuan Trent – Miss Kentucky 2010
 Horace M. Trent - American physicist
 Rocky Tuan – vice-chancellor of the Chinese University of Hong Kong
 C. C. Vaughn - Kentucky educator and minister
 Muse Watson – American actor
 Billy Edd Wheeler – songwriter, performer and writer
 Carter G. Woodson – African American historian, author, journalist and co-founder of Black History Month

See also

 Gott v. Berea College

References

Bibliography
 
 
 Peck, Elizabeth. Berea's First Century, 1855–1955. Lexington: University of Kentucky Press, 1955.
 Wilson, Shannon H. Berea College: An Illustrated History. Lexington: University Press of Kentucky, 2006.

External links

 
 Official athletic website

 
Liberal arts colleges in Kentucky
Educational institutions established in 1855
Universities and colleges accredited by the Southern Association of Colleges and Schools
Buildings and structures in Madison County, Kentucky
Appalachian culture in Kentucky
Education in Madison County, Kentucky
1855 establishments in Kentucky
Work colleges
American Missionary Association
USCAA member institutions
Private universities and colleges in Kentucky